Wang Nanzhen (27 November 1911 – 1992) was a Chinese basketball player. He competed in the men's tournament at the 1936 Summer Olympics.

References

External links

1911 births
1992 deaths
Chinese men's basketball players
Olympic basketball players of China
Basketball players at the 1936 Summer Olympics
Basketball players from Jiangsu
People from Yixing
Sportspeople from Wuxi
Republic of China men's national basketball team players